The National Vietnam Veterans Museum is an Australian war museum located in Phillip Island, Victoria. Originally it was established in San Remo, Victoria in 1996 by Vietnam veteran John Methven. In March 2007 it moved to a larger site near the Phillip Island Airport. The museum contains a large collection of items and vehicles, including a Centurion tank, a Mark V International Harvester truck and a 105mm pack howitzer. It also has a collection of aircraft from the era of the Vietnam war, including a de Havilland Canada DHC-4 Caribou transport plane, an English Electric Canberra bomber, a Westland Wessex helicopter, a Bell AH-1 Cobra helicopter gunship, Bell UH-1 Iroquois helicopter, a Bell H-13 Sioux helicopter and a Grumman S-2 Tracker anti-submarine warfare aircraft.

References

External links
 Official homepage

Aerospace museums in Australia
Military and war museums in Australia
Vietnam War museums
Museums in Victoria (Australia)